The church of  San Clemente is an ancient Roman Catholic church located near the Piazza del Foro, in central Brescia, region of Lombardy, Italy.

History
A church at the site is documented by 954, and was initially attached to the adjacent Benedictine monastery. The church and convent were destroyed during a Venetian siege in 1517.

The present plan was completed by the late 15th century. Further reconstructions occurred, with the latest which gave the present façade in 1800 under the architect Rodolfo Vantini.

Description
The interior of the portico has a damaged fresco of Pope Clement I with Christ and saints. The main altar from 18th century was a work of Antonio Calegari. The choir is frescoed by Antonio Capello.

The church contains a number of masterpieces by Moretto, including:
St Ursula and Thousand Virgins
Mystical Wedding of St Catherine of Alexandria with Saints Catherine of Siena, Paul, and Jerome
Offer of Melchisedech to Abraham
a striking  Assumption or Virgin in Glory with Saints Clement, Domenic, Florian, Catherina and Mary Magdalen
Martyred Female Saints (Saints Cecilia, Lucia, Barbara, Agnese, and Agata).

The church also has a fresco of a Resurrection with St. Clement and Teresa painted by Il Romanino, a contemporary of Moretto.

References
Bresciarte website

Clemente
Clemente
Clemente